Seán Michael Dorgan (born 13 March 1968) is an Irish Fianna Fáil politician who has served as General Secretary of Fianna Fáil since June 2007.

He was also briefly a member of the 22nd Seanad, to which he was nominated by the Taoiseach, Bertie Ahern, on 23 June 2007, to fill one of the vacancies left by the election of four senators to Dáil Éireann at the 2007 general election.

References

1968 births
Living people
Fianna Fáil senators
Members of the 22nd Seanad
Nominated members of Seanad Éireann